Rufat Ismayilov (born 16 June 1996) is an Azerbaijani judoka.

He is the gold medallist of the 2017 Judo Grand Slam Baku in the -81 kg category.

References

External links

 
 

1996 births
Living people
Azerbaijani male judoka
21st-century Azerbaijani people
20th-century Azerbaijani people